Finland competed at the 2012 Winter Youth Olympics in Innsbruck, Austria. The Finnish team consisted of 42 athletes competing in 10 different sports.

Medalists

Alpine skiing

Boys

Girls

Biathlon

Boys

Girls

Mixed

Cross country skiing

Boys

Girls

Sprint

Mixed

Figure skating

Boys

Girls

Mixed

Freestyle skiing

While formally listed to compete Wilma Löfgren was not registered in any events.

Ski Cross

Ski Half-Pipe

Ice hockey

Boys

Markus Haapanen
Jaakko Hälli
Manu Honkanen
Waltteri Hopponen
Kaapo Kähkönen
Juuso Kannel
Kasperi Kapanen
Antti Kauppinen
Joel Kiviranta
Alex Levanen
Otto Nieminen
Miikka Pitkänen
Jere Rouhiainen
Eetu Sopanen
Otto Tolvanen
Joni Tuulola
Jonne Yliniemi

Group A

Semifinals

Gold medal game

Final rank:

Nordic combined

Boys

Ski jumping

Boys

Girls

Team w/Nordic Combined

Speed skating

Boys

Snowboarding

Boys

Girls

See also
Finland at the 2012 Summer Olympics

References

2012 in Finnish sport
Nations at the 2012 Winter Youth Olympics
Finland at the Youth Olympics